A partial solar eclipse will occur on Monday, July 22, 2047. A solar eclipse occurs when the Moon passes between Earth and the Sun, thereby totally or partly obscuring the image of the Sun for a viewer on Earth. A partial solar eclipse occurs in the polar regions of the Earth when the center of the Moon's shadow misses the Earth.

Images
Animated path

Related eclipses

Solar eclipses of 2044–2047

Metonic cycle

References

External links

2047 07 22
2047 07 22